Klejwy PGR, is a settlement in the administrative district of Gmina Sejny, within Sejny County, Podlaskie Voivodeship, in north-eastern Poland, close to the border with Lithuania.

References

Klejwy PGR